The 2020 CONCACAF U-20 Championship qualifying stage took place between 15–23 February 2020. The teams competed for four of the 20 berths in the 2020 CONCACAF U-20 Championship final tournament.

Teams
The qualifying format changed from the 2016 edition (no qualifying was held for the 2018 edition), and the teams were no longer divided into regional zones.

The 41 CONCACAF teams were ranked based on the CONCACAF Men’s Under-20 Ranking as of June 2019. A total of 33 teams entered the tournament. The highest-ranked 16 entrants were exempt from qualifying and advanced directly to the group stage of the final tournament, while the lowest-ranked 17 entrants had to participate in qualifying, where the four group winners advanced to the round of 16 of the knockout stage of the final tournament.

Notes

Draw
The draw for the qualifying round took place on 20 November 2019, 11:00 EST (UTC−5), at the CONCACAF Headquarters in Miami. The 17 teams which entered the qualifying stage were drawn into four groups: one group of five teams and three groups of four teams.

Qualifying stage
The winners of each group qualify for the 2020 CONCACAF U-20 Championship, where they enter the round of 16 of the knockout stage.

Group A
All times are local, UTC−6.

Group B
All times are local, UTC−4.

Group C
All times are local, UTC−4.

Group D
All times are local, UTC−4.

Goalscorers

References

External links
Concacaf Under-20 Championship, CONCACAF.com

Qualifying stage
U-20 Championship qualifying stage
2020 in youth association football
CONCACAF U-20 Championship qualification
February 2020 sports events in North America